Ninjababy is a 2021 Norwegian dramedy film directed by Yngvild Sve Flikke, from a screenplay by Johan Fasting, based on Inga H Sætre's graphic novel Fallteknikk. The film stars Kristine Thorp, Arthur Berning and Nader Khademi.

The film had its worldwide premiere at the 2021 Tromsø International Film Festival on January 18, 2021 and will have an international premiere at the 71st Berlin International Film Festival in the Generation 14plus section.

Plot

Cast
 Kristine Thorp as Rakel
 Arthur Berning
 Nader Khademi

Reception 
The review aggregator website Rotten Tomatoes surveyed  and, categorizing the reviews as positive or negative, assessed 5 as positive and 0 as negative for a 100% rating. Among the reviews, it determined an average rating of 7 out of 10.

References

External links
 
 

2021 films
2021 comedy-drama films
2020s Norwegian-language films
Norwegian comedy-drama films
Films based on Norwegian comics
Films set in Oslo